B&H most commonly refers to B&H Photo Video, a photo and video equipment store in the United States.

B&H may also refer to:

Places
 Bosnia and Herzegovina, a country in Southeastern Europe
 Brighton and Hove, England

Organisations
 B&H Airlines of Bosnia and Herzegovina
 B & H Tool Works, an American tool and die company headquartered in Richmond, Kentucky 
 B&H Publishing Group, a division of LifeWay Christian Resources
 B&H Rail, formerly the Bath and Hammondsport Railroad, a shortline in upstate New York
 Bell & Howell, a photographic equipment maker, now part of Böwe Bell & Howell
 Benson & Hedges, a British brand of cigarettes
 Benson & Hedges Cup, a one-day cricket competition held from 1972 to 2002
 Benson & Hedges Cup (UK Ice Hockey), a name of the Autumn Cup from 1982 until 2000
 Blood and Honour, an international neo-Nazi organisation
 Boosey & Hawkes, a British music publisher, purported to be the largest specialist classical music publisher in the world
 Breitkopf & Härtel a German music publisher, purported to be the world's oldest music publishing house

See also
 Black and white
 BH (disambiguation)